Granulopyrenis is a genus of fungi in the family Pyrenulaceae.

References

External links
Granulopyrenis at Index Fungorum

Eurotiomycetes genera
Pyrenulales
Taxa named by André Aptroot